Uuen son of Onuist (died 839), commonly referred to by the hypocoristic Eóganán, was king of the Picts between AD 837–839.

Life 
Uuen was a son of Onuist II [son of] Uurguist [Wrguist] (in Gaelic: Óengus II mac Fergusa, died 834) and succeeded his cousin Drest mac Caustantín as king in 836 or 837. The sole notice of Uuen in the Irish annals is the report of his death, together with his brother Bran and "Áed mac Boanta, and others almost innumerable" in a battle fought by the men of Fortriu against Vikings in 839. This defeat appears to have ended the century-long domination of Pictland by the descendants of Onuist I [son of] Wrguist (in Gaelic: Óengus I mac Fergusa).

If the annalistic record is short, there are other traditions relating to Uuen. He is named by the  St Andrews foundation tale as one of the sons of Onuist who met with Saint Regulus at Forteviot when the Saint supposedly brought the relics of Saint Andrew to Scotland. Along with his uncle Caustantín, Uuen appears to have been a patron of the Northumbrian monasteries as he is named in the Liber Vitae Dunelmensis, which contains a list of those for whom prayers were said, dating from around 840.

Uuen, his father, his uncle and his cousin Domnall appear in the Duan Albanach, a praise poem from the reign of Máel Coluim (III) mac Donnchada listing Máel Coluim's predecessors as kings of Scots, of Alba and of Dál Riata from Fergus Mór and his brothers onwards. Their inclusion in this source and its like is thought to be due to their importance to the foundation traditions of Dunkeld and St Andrews.

On Uuen's death the Pictish Chronicle king lists have him followed by the short reigns of Uurad (Ferat) and Uurad's sons Bridei, Cináed and Drest, by Bridei son of Fochel (Uuthoil) and by Cináed mac Ailpín (Ciniod [son of] Elphin), the eventual victor and founder of a new ruling clan.

See also
 House of Óengus

Notes

References

 Anderson, Alan Orr, Early Sources of Scottish History A.D 500–1286, volume 1. Reprinted with corrections, Stamford: Paul Watkins, 1990. 
 Broun, Dauvit, "Pictish Kings 761-839: Integration with Dál Riata or Separate Development" in Sally Foster (ed.) The St Andrews Sarcophagus: A Pictish masterpiece and its international connections. Dublin: Four Courts Press, 1998. 
 Clancy, Thomas Owen, "Caustantín son of Fergus (Uurgust)" in M. Lynch (ed.) The Oxford Companion to Scottish History. Oxford & New York: Oxford UP, 2002. 
 Forsyth, Katherine, "Evidence of a lost Pictish source in the Historia Regum Anglorum of Symeon of Durham", in Simon Taylor (ed.) Kings, clerics and chronicles in Scotland, 500-1297: essays in honour of Marjorie Ogilvie Anderson on the occasion of her ninetieth birthday. Dublin: Four Courts Press, 2000. 
 Smyth, Alfred P. Warlords and Holy Men: Scotland AD 80-1000. Reprinted, Edinburgh: Edinburgh UP, 1998.

External links
Annals of Ulster, part 1, at CELT (translated)
Duan Albanach, at CELT (translated)
The Pictish Chronicle 

839 deaths
Pictish monarchs
9th-century Scottish monarchs
Monarchs killed in action
Year of birth unknown